{{DISPLAYTITLE:C19H30O3}}
The molecular formula C19H30O3 (molar mass: 306.446 g/mol) may refer to:

 Hydroxyepiandrosterones
 7α-Hydroxyepiandrosterone
 7β-Hydroxyepiandrosterone
 Oxandrolone

Molecular formulas